Santa Fe Bound is a 1936 American Western film directed by Harry S. Webb and produced by Webb and Bernard B. Ray for Reliable Pictures.

Plot
Out on the trail cowboy Tom Crenshaw is forced to shoot and kill a bushwhacker. He takes the dead man's money belt and a letter he finds on him into the nearest town. It turns out that the bushwhacker was a killer hired by a local bandit leader, and the gang thinks that Tom is the man they hired. Tom decides to play along so he can expose the gang and bring them to justice, but it turns out that he gets into quite a bit more trouble than he bargained for.

Cast 
 Tom Tyler as Tom Crenshaw
 Jeanne Martel as Molly Bates
 Richard Cramer as Stanton
 Slim Whitaker as One-Shot Morgan
 Ed Cassidy as Henchman Logan
 Lafe McKee as Sheriff
 Dorothy Woods as Bridget, the housekeeper
 Charles King as Steve Denton
 Earl Dwire as Tibbets, mob leader

External links 
 
 

1936 films
1936 Western (genre) films
American Western (genre) films
American black-and-white films
Films directed by Bernard B. Ray
Reliable Pictures films
1930s English-language films
1930s American films